Gerlem Willian de Jesus Almeida (born August 7, 1984, in Linhares, Espírito Santo), known as just Gerlem Willian, is a Brazilian professional footballer.

After playing for Bahia (a team in Brazil), he signed a contract with Portuguese second league team Estoril, but after being suspended for indiscipline, the club gave him in 2007 to Farul Constanţa, which plays in the Romanian first league.
Following Farul Constanţa's relegation, Gerlem moved to SC Vaslui for a transfer fee of 600.000 euros.

Statistics 

Statistics accurate as of match played 14 December 2011

External links

1984 births
People from Linhares
Living people
Brazilian footballers
Brazilian expatriate footballers
Association football forwards
Expatriate footballers in Portugal
Expatriate footballers in Romania
Expatriate footballers in Sweden
Campeonato Brasileiro Série A players
Campeonato Brasileiro Série B players
Syrianska FC players
Allsvenskan players
Superettan players
Liga I players
Esporte Clube Bahia players
G.D. Estoril Praia players
FCV Farul Constanța players
FC Vaslui players
Esporte Clube Vitória players
Linhares Futebol Clube players
Macaé Esporte Futebol Clube players
AFC Eskilstuna players
Colo Colo de Futebol e Regatas players
Rio Branco Atlético Clube players
Espírito Santo Futebol Clube players
Sportspeople from Espírito Santo